Clovenstone is a neighbourhood in southwestern Edinburgh, Scotland. It is adjacent to Wester Hailes and the A720 road.

Areas of Edinburgh
Housing estates in Edinburgh